Erdem Türetken (born 5 April 1979) is a Turkish professional basketball player. He currently plays for Trabzonspor.

He studied at Anadolu University.

References

External links
Profile at galatasaray.org
Profile at tblstat.net
Profile at tbl.org.tr

1979 births
Living people
Aliağa Petkim basketball players
Anadolu University alumni
Beşiktaş men's basketball players
Darüşşafaka Basketbol players
Galatasaray S.K. (men's basketball) players
Kepez Belediyesi S.K. players
People from Amasya
Turkish men's basketball players
Small forwards